The 2002 season was Santos Futebol Clube's ninety season in existence and the club's forty-third consecutive season in the top flight of Brazilian football.

This season marked the new Meninos da Vila generation, where Robinho, Diego, Elano, Léo, Alex, Renato and others, helped Santos win their 6th Campeonato Brasileiro title, in which the club had not won since 1968.

Players

Squad

Appearances and goals

Transfers

In

Out

Friendlies

Competitions

Overall summary

Detailed overall summary

Campeonato Brasileiro

First stage

Quarter-final

Semi-final

Final

Copa do Brasil

First round

Second round

Torneio Rio-São Paulo

References

External links
Official Site

2002
Santos F.C.